Bert or Herbert Ward may refer to:

 Herbert Ward (footballer) (1873–1897), English footballer who played for Southampton and Hampshire cricketer
 Herbert Ward (rugby) (1873–1955), rugby union footballer who played for England and Bradford F.C.
 Herbert Ward (sculptor) (1863–1919), British sculptor, explorer, writer and friend of Roger Casement
 G. H. B. Ward (also known as Bert Ward, 1876–1957), activist for walkers' rights and a Labour Party politician
 Herbert Dickinson Ward (1861–1932), American author
 Burt Ward (born 1945), American television actor and activist
 Herbert Ward (priest), father of John Sebastian Marlowe Ward